The 2018 Ole Miss Rebels football team represented the University of Mississippi in the 2018 NCAA Division I FBS football season. The Rebels  played their home games at Vaught-Hemingway Stadium in Oxford, Mississippi and competed in the Western Division of the Southeastern Conference (SEC). They were led by second-year head coach Matt Luke. They finished the season 5–7, 1–7 in SEC play to finish in sixth place in the Western Division.

On December 1, 2017, the University of Mississippi was dealt multiple sanctions by the NCAA, including a 2-year post-season ban. As Ole Miss already self-imposed a post-season ban during the 2017 season, 2018 will be the last season without post-season play due to the sanctions. On February 5, 2018, the university submitted a written appeal to the NCAA regarding the penalties, stating: “This Committee should vacate and reverse the penalties and factual findings, because the COI (Committee of Infractions) abused its discretion, departed from precedent, committed procedural errors, and reached factual conclusions inconsistent with the evidence.”

Previous season
The Rebels finished the 2017 season 6–6, 3–5 in SEC play to finish in sixth place in the Western Division. They did not participate in a bowl game while serving a one year self imposed bowl ban.

Preseason

Award watch lists
Listed in the order that they were released

SEC media poll
The SEC media poll was released on July 20, 2018 with the Rebels predicted to finish in sixth place.

Preseason All-SEC teams
The Rebels had three players selected to the preseason all-SEC teams.

Offense

1st team

A. J. Brown – WR

Greg Little – OL

3rd team

Javon Patterson – OL

Recruiting
The Rebels’ 2018 recruiting class was ranked 32nd in the nation and 10th in the SEC by 247Sports.

Schedule
Ole Miss announced its 2018 football schedule on September 19, 2017. The 2018 schedule consists of 7 home and 5 away games in the regular season. The Rebels will host SEC foes Alabama, Auburn, South Carolina, and Mississippi State, and will travel to LSU, Arkansas (game played in Little Rock), Texas A&M, and Vanderbilt.

The Rebels will be hosting three of their four non-conference opponents, hosting Southern Illinois (FCS), Kent State from the Mid-American Conference, Louisiana–Monroe from the Sun Belt Conference, and will then travel to Houston for their neutral site season opener against Texas Tech from the Big 12 Conference, which is the 2018 edition of the 
AdvoCare Texas Kickoff.

Schedule Source:

Personnel

Coaching staff

Game summaries

vs Texas Tech

Southern Illinois

#1 Alabama

Kent State

at #5 LSU

Louisiana-Monroe

at Arkansas

Auburn

South Carolina

at Texas A&M

at Vanderbilt

#18 Mississippi State

Players drafted into the NFL

See also
 2017–18 Ole Miss Rebels men's basketball team
 2017–18 Ole Miss Rebels women's basketball team
 2018 Ole Miss Rebels baseball team

References

Ole Miss
Ole Miss Rebels football seasons
Ole Miss Rebels football